Johnatan Mathis (born 7 May 1981, in Nancy) is a French rower.

References 
 

1981 births
Living people
French male rowers
Sportspeople from Nancy, France
World Rowing Championships medalists for France